Robert Pope may refer to:

Rob Pope, American musician
Robert Pope (priest) (1916–2002), Anglican clergyman
Robert Pope (MP) for Gloucester
Robert J. Pope (1865–1949), New Zealand poet, songwriter and teacher
Robert Pope (runner) (born 1977), British distance runner